Utetheisa clareae is a moth in the family Erebidae. It was described by Robinson in 1971. It is found on Fiji.

References

Moths described in 1971
clareae